Ethminolia durbanensis is a species of sea snail, a marine gastropod mollusk in the family Trochidae, the top snails.

Distribution
This species occurs in the Indian Ocean off Durban , Natal, South Africa.

References

 Kilburn, R.N., 1977. Taxonomic studies on the marine mollusca of southern Africa and Mozambique. Part I. Annals of the Natal Museum 23(1): 173-214

External links
 To World Register of Marine Species

durbanensis
Gastropods described in 1977